Kurt Hugo Schneider (born September 7, 1988), sometimes referred to by his initials KHS, is an American video editor, producer, musician, singer and songwriter, whose primary medium is YouTube music videos. He has  produced music videos for various YouTube musicians, such as Sam Tsui.

Early life 
Kurt Hugo Schneider was born in Baltimore to Laurie S. Auth, a visual artist, and Michael Schneider, a mathematician. He grew up in Blue Bell, Pennsylvania, a suburb of Philadelphia, where he lived just a street away from Sam Tsui, whom he met while attending middle school. They both later attended Wissahickon High School. He graduated class valedictorian.

Schneider attended Yale University, where he got his start producing videos when he worked at Yale's Digital Media Center for the Arts. He graduated magna cum laude in 2010 with a degree in mathematics and was inducted into Phi Beta Kappa.

Career

Collaboration with Sam Tsui

Schneider began collaborating with Sam Tsui while they were both students at Wissahickon High School.

Schneider and Jake Bruene created the musical web series College Musical fall semester 2008 at Yale. Schneider composed the songs and cast the project from Yale's music community, which included Sam Tsui and Allison Williams. The first episode aired on YouTube in January 2009. They shot an independent film based upon their online musical series, College Musical: The Movie, summer of 2010 and released online it on September 3, 2014. A series of behind-the-scenes videos for the movie, filmed and narrated by Nick Uhas, has been released on YouTube.

He produced videos of Tsui singing covers and medleys.

They garnered wide media attention with a video of a Michael Jackson medley. This video remains the 9th most viewed (more than 34 million) on Schneider's YouTube channel KurtHugoSchneider. This medley is one of several in which Schneider, using video editing, creates the illusion of a one-man a cappella choir, with Tsui covering lead and backing vocals, playing multiple versions of himself. Their medley videos have been described by Time as a combination of Glee and Attack of the Clones. The viral videos led to a few appearances on national television, including The Oprah Winfrey Show and The Ellen DeGeneres Show. On February 3, 2011, Schneider's video of Tsui covering Hold It Against Me, in which Tsui sang and played the piano with Schneider on percussion, was featured on Britney Spears' official website.

The popularity of their videos has encouraged the duo to branch out to other projects. Since September 2010, Schneider and Tsui have also begun to release videos of original songs and in May 2013, Sam Tsui's debut original album, Make It Up, was released.

Other works

Schneider has also made music videos in collaboration with other artists. Popular videos include a Miley Cyrus medley sung by Christina Grimmie, a duet between Tsui and Grimmie singing Just a Dream (the most viewed video on 'KurtHugoSchneider', with over two hundred million views), and a Starcraft-themed parody video, with Husky, of "Baby". He has also parodied the infamous "Friday" by Rebecca Black with his variation being known as "Void Rays". He has collaborated with Tiffany Alvord on a Taylor Swift medley and Matisse on a medley of Rihanna songs. Some of his earlier videos include collaborations with now-actress Allison Williams. He has also collaborated with Max Schneider (no relation) on a number of occasions: for example he directed a Bruno Mars medley for Schneider and Victoria Justice, a Maroon 5 medley and a Christmas medley. Schneider also co-wrote 'Standing In China' with Schneider for Cody Simpson's album Paradise. Schneider was also an associate producer for a musical admissions video for Yale, which features a cast consisting of Tsui and fellow Yale students.

He has also performed a cover of "Beauty and the Beat" by Justin Bieber with Alex Goot and Chrissy Costanza from Against the Current as well as a cover of "Counting Stars" by OneRepublic, a cover of "Can't Hold Us" by Macklemore and Ryan Lewis, and a cover of "Heart Attack" by Demi Lovato with Halocene.

Collaboration with Coca-Cola
In 2013, Schneider and Coca-Cola created music videos featuring creative covers of two 2011 singles: Calvin Harris' "Feel So Close" and Of Monsters and Men's "Little Talks" for a campaign called "The Sounds of AHH". Commercial edits of the singles premiered on the inaugural episode of season 13 of American Idol on January 14, 2014, on FOX.

In the two new versions, recreated by Schneider, he is shown making the track playing only Coca-Cola bottles, glasses and cans. In addition, "Feels So Close" features the vocals of Sam Tsui whereas on the track "Little Talks", he is accompanied musically by beatboxing cellist Kevin Olusola.

Chess and puzzles
Schneider played for Yale's chess team. He currently holds a USCF Elo rating of 2235, holding the title of master, and has held a blindfolded simultaneous exhibition for the comedy series The Try Guys. He has also featured at the CES 2014 in the HRM Chess Tournament, hosted by Nordic Semiconductor in Las Vegas, while playing against Magnus Carlsen.

In February 2020, Schneider created a sudoku-based puzzle for Cracking the Cryptic.

Personal life
He is of German and Austrian descent on his father's side. Schneider has an older sister who is a classical pianist.

In August 2019 Schneider got engaged to his girlfriend of 5 years, Patty Ho. They were married in September 2021.

Discography

The following is a list of singles released digitally to iTunes Store and recorded with artists other than Sam Tsui.

Covers

Filmography

Film

Music videos

This list covers only music videos made for solo works, Sam Tsui originals and collaborations with other artists not listed in the discography for Sam Tsui.

References

External links
 

1988 births
American chess players
American people of Austrian descent
American people of German descent
Record producers from Pennsylvania
Living people
Musicians from Baltimore
Musicians from Pennsylvania
People from Montgomery County, Pennsylvania
Yale University alumni
American YouTubers
American male pianists
21st-century American pianists
21st-century American male musicians
Music YouTubers
Shorty Award winners